() is a genre of improvised oral poetry from Ethiopia. The genre originates in the Ethiopian Orthodox Tewahedo Church, which historically provided traditional religious education, including the composition of qene. Its origins are supposed to date back to the 14th century.

Elements

Sam-ena-warq
The defining characteristic of qene is a literary device known as sem-ena-werq (“wax and gold”), which uses ambiguity to layer hidden meanings within the text; the term refers to an obvious meaning (the wax) above a deeper meaning (the gold). In the process of goldsmithing, a clay cast is made around wax, after which the wax is drained and molten gold is poured into the cast. This device is similar to a double entendre, and is predicated on multiple meanings of individual words or sentences.

Wista weira
Wista weira (“inside the olive”) is a literary device similar to sem-ena-werq, though less common. While it also uses ambiguity to provide hidden meanings, its ambiguity comes from interpretation of the qene as a whole, rather than words or sentences.

History

Origin claims
Tradition credits its invention to Tawanay of Gojjam, who is said to have lived in the 14th century and founded the famous Qene school of Gonj. Other tradition claims further back to Yared, a 6th-century Aksumite composer.

Earliest documentation
The earliest specimens of qene extant date back to the late 15th century to the reign of Emperor Eskender (1478–94).

Qene schools
Qene has always been associated with Amhara culture and people, although it was originally composed in Ge'ez. The main qene schools have always been located in Amhara areas, such as Gonj and Washara monasteries in Gojjam, at Gondar town in Begemder, Sayint in Wollo and Wadla monastery in Lasta. The rules and style of qene were historically taught as part of religious education in the Ethiopian Orthodox Church, in the level of schooling known as qene bet (“house of poetry”). 

Well-known modern Ethiopian poets include Tsegaye Gabre-Medhin, Kebede Michael, and Mengistu Lemma.

Themes
Sem-ena-werq in religious qene represents the dualism of Miaphysite Christianity, such as that of the Ethiopian Orthodox Church. These poems were composed for religious events and church activities. Secular qene was historically used to subtly insult and criticize those in positions of authority.

See also
 Ethiopian literature

References

Ethiopian poetry
Ethiopian literature